Essays in Economic & Business History is an annual peer-reviewed academic journal covering economic and business history. It is published by the Economic & Business History Society. The editors-in-chief are Mark Billings (University of Exeter) and Daniel Giedeman (Grand Valley State University).

History
The journal was founded in 1975 and the first issue was published in 1976. The following persons have been editors-in-chief:

Abstracting and indexing
The journal is abstracted and indexed in America: History and Life, EconLit, Historical Abstracts, and the Modern Language Association Database.

References

External links

English-language journals
Economic history journals
Publications established in 1975
History of business
Annual journals
Open access journals